Zhargalma Ochirovna Tsyrenova (born 9 June 1989) is a Russian freestyle wrestler of Buryat descent. She was a bronze medalist at the Golden Grand Prix Ivan Yarygin 2015 in the 60 kg division.

Tsyrenova was born in Barguzinsky District of Buryatia, and her nationality is Buryat. Her parents had 7 sons and 3 daughters, many of whom were keen for wrestling. Zhargalma was the youngest daughter; 3 of her elder brothers were wrestlers and received a title Master of sports. When she was at school, she moved to Ulan-Ude and began to practice wrestling under the supervision of coach Tsyden Gulgenov.

In 2009, Tsyrenova won a silver medal at the Russian wrestling championship in Stavropol, at 2010 - silver medal of Russia wrestling cup, 2011 - silver medal of "Ivan Yarygin International" in Krasnoyarsk. At 2012 she won the Russian wrestling cup in Lobnya.

At the beginning of 2013 Zhargalma Tsyrenova won "Ivan Yarygin International" in Krasnoyarsk, later she won a silver medal of 2013 European Wrestling Championships.

In January 2022, she won the silver medal in the women's 59 kg event at the Golden Grand Prix Ivan Yarygin held in Krasnoyarsk, Russia. In February 2022, she won the silver medal in the women's 59 kg event at the Yasar Dogu Tournament held in Istanbul, Turkey.

References

External links 
 Profile of Zhargalma Tsyrenova on the site of Russia Sport Wrestling Federation

1989 births
Living people
Russian female sport wrestlers

People from Barguzinsky District
European Wrestling Championships medalists
Sportspeople from Buryatia
20th-century Russian women
21st-century Russian women